Charles Edward Springall (19 June 1925 – 23 December 2006), known professionally as Charlie Drake, was an English comedian, actor, writer and singer.

With his small stature (5' 1"/155 cm tall), curly red hair and liking for slapstick, he was a popular comedian with children in his early years, becoming nationally known for his "Hello, my darlings!" catchphrase.

Early life
Born Charles Edward Springall in the Elephant and Castle, Southwark, South London, he took his mother's maiden name for the stage and, later, film and television, achieving success as a comedian.

Career
Drake made his first appearance on stage at the age of eight, and after leaving school toured working men's clubs. After serving in the Royal Air Force during the Second World War, Drake turned professional and made his television début in The Centre Show in 1953. He then joined his wartime comrade Jack Edwardes to form a double act, named 'Mick and Montmorency'. In 1954 he appeared with Bob Monkhouse and Denis Goodwin in their BBC Television Service sketch comedy show, Fast and Loose.

He appeared in the television shows Laughter in Store (1957), Drake's Progress (1957–58), Charlie Drake In… (1958 to 1960) and The Charlie Drake Show (1960 to 1961), being remembered for his opening catchphrase "Hello, my darlings!" The catchphrase came about because he was short, and so his eyes would often be naturally directly level with a lady's bosom. Because of this and because in his television work he preferred appearing with big-busted women, the catchphrase was born.

Bookcase incident
In 1961, the later series was brought to an abrupt end, however, by a serious accident which occurred during a live transmission. Drake had arranged for a bookcase to be set up in such a way that it would fall apart when he was pulled through it during a slapstick sketch.

It was later discovered that an overenthusiastic workman had "mended" the bookcase before the broadcast. The actors working with him, unaware of what had happened, proceeded with the rest of the sketch which required that they pick him up and throw him through an open window. Drake fractured his skull and was unconscious for three days. It would be two years before he returned to the screen.

Comeback
Drake returned to television in 1963 with The Charlie Drake Show, a compilation of which won an award at the Montreux Festival in 1968. The centrepiece of this was an extended sketch featuring an orchestra performing the 1812 Overture, in which Drake appeared to play all the instruments; as well as conducting and one scene in which he was the player of a triangle waiting for his cue to play a single strike – which he subsequently missed.

Other shows included Who Is Sylvia? (1967) and Slapstick and Old Lace (1971), but it was The Worker (1965 to 1970) that gained most acclaim.

Television fame led to four films, none of them successful — Sands of the Desert (1960), Petticoat Pirates (1961), The Cracksman (1963) and Mister Ten Per Cent (1967).

He was the subject of This Is Your Life on two occasions, in December 1961 when he was surprised by Eamonn Andrews in a rehearsal room at the London Palladium, and in November 1995, when Michael Aspel surprised him at the curtain call of the comedy play Funny Money at the Playhouse Theatre.

The Worker

In The Worker (ATV/ITV, 1965–70) he played a perpetually unemployed labourer who, in every episode, was dispatched to a new job by the ever-frustrated clerk (firstly Mr Whittaker in series one, played by Percy Herbert, and from series two onwards Mr Pugh, played by Henry McGee) at the local labour exchange. All the jobs he embarked upon ended in disaster, sometimes with a burst of classic slapstick, sometimes with a bewildered Drake himself at the centre of incomprehensible actions by the people employing him. Bookending these sequences were the encounters between Drake and the labour exchange clerk. Running jokes included Drake's inability to manage the name of the clerk, with Mr Whittaker rendered as Mr Wicketer and then Mr Pugh variously mispronounced from a childish "Mi'er Poo" to "Peeyooo". Drake sang the theme song himself, using an old music hall number. The series was briefly revived by London Weekend Television in 1978 as a series of short sketches on Bruce Forsyth's Big Night, with Drake and McGee reprising their roles.

Recording career 
Drake made a number of records, most of them produced by George Martin for the Parlophone label. The first, "Splish Splash", a cover version of a rock and roll song originally recorded by Bobby Darin, got into the Top 10 of the UK Singles Chart, reaching number 7 in 1958. In 1961, "My Boomerang Won't Come Back" became a mid-chart UK hit (No. 14) and an edited, more politically correct, version (with one word overdubbed) was a No 21 US hit, a follow up   to "Mr. Custer" (No. 12 UK charts).

In 1972 Drake recorded a spoof song called 'Puckwudgie' on Columbia records. It referred to a 2-or-3-foot-tall (0.61 or 0.91 m) being from the Wampanoag folklore. It reached number 47 in the BBC Top 50 in early 1972.

Peter Gabriel, after leaving Genesis in late 1975, produced a single "You Never Know" for Drake (UK Charisma), it was not a chart success.

Later career
Drake turned to straight acting in the 1980s, winning acclaim for his role as Touchstone in Shakespeare's As You Like It (at the Ludlow Festival), and an award for his part in Harold Pinter's The Caretaker at the Royal Exchange, Manchester, along with Michael Angelis. Drake also starred as Smallweed in the BBC adaptation of Bleak House (1985), and Filipina Dreamgirls, a TV film for the BBC. His final appearances on stage were with Jim Davidson in Sinderella, his adult adaptation of Cinderella, as Baron Hard-on. A live recording of one of the dates on the tour of the pantomime was later adapted, and edited for video, and put out for sale nationwide.

Personal life
Drake was married twice. He was married to Heather Barnes from 1953 until 1971, and they had three sons. In 1976, Drake married his second wife, Elaine Bird, but the marriage was dissolved in 1984.

Retirement
Drake suffered a stroke in 1995 and retired, staying at Brinsworth House, a retirement home for actors and performers, run by the Entertainment Artistes' Benevolent Fund, until his death on 23 December 2006, after suffering multiple strokes the previous night.

Discography

Singles
 "Splish Splash" / "Hello My Darlings" (1958) UK No. 7
 "Volare" / "Itchy Twitchy Feeling" (1958) UK No. 28
 "Tom Thumb's Tune" / "Goggle Eye Ghee" (1958)
 "Sea Cruise" / "Starkle Starkle Little Twink" (1959)
 "Naughty" / "Old Mr Shadow" (1960)
 "Mr. Custer" / "Glow Worm" (1960) UK No. 12
 "My Boomerang Won't Come Back" / "She's My Girl" (1961) UK No. 14 ; US #21; Australia No. 1
 "Tanglefoot" / "Drake's Progress" (1962)
 "I Bent My Assegai" / "Sweet Freddy Green" (1962)
 "I've Lost The End of My Yodel" / "I Can, Can't I" (1963)
 "I'm Too Heavy for the Light Brigade" / "The Reluctant Tight-Rope Walker" (1964)
 "Charles Drake 007" / "Bumpanology" (1964)
 "Only A Working Man" / "I'm A Boy" (1965)
 "Don't Trim My Wick" / "Birds" (1966)
 "Who Is Sylvia" / "I Wanna Be a Group" (1967)
 "Puckwudgie" / "Toffee and Tears" (1972) UK No. 47
 "Someone opened the Watergate and they all got wet" / "'Ello Erf" (1973)
 "You Never Know" / "I'm Big Enough for Me" (1976) (produced by Peter Gabriel)
 "Super Punk" (1976) (spoof record)

Theme Tune from The Worker
Drake sang the theme song himself, based upon an old music hall song
I gets up every mornin' when the clock strikes eight
I'm always punctual, never never late
With a nice cup of tea, a little round of toast
The Sporting Life and the Winning Post.
I gets all nice and tidy, then I toddles off to work
I do the best I can
Cos I'm only a-doin' what a bloke should do
Cos I'm only a workin' man!

The song, "Only A Working Man", written by Herbert Rule and Fred Holt in 1923, was featured by Lily Morris on the music hall stage, and in the 1930 film, Elstree Calling, the original lyric being "He's only a workin' man".

Filmography

Notes

References

External links

Bio at Screenonline.com
[ Allmusic]

1925 births
2006 deaths
English male comedians
English male film actors
English male stage actors
English male television actors
People from Elephant and Castle
Butlins Redcoats
20th-century English comedians
21st-century English comedians
British novelty song performers
British comedy musicians
Royal Air Force personnel of World War II